Juan Carlos Mandiá Lorenzo (born 17 January 1967) is a Spanish retired footballer who played as a defender, currently assistant manager of Greek club Olympiacos.

Playing career
Mandiá was born in Alfoz, Province of Lugo. Over a 16-year playing career he represented Real Madrid Castilla (adding two first-team appearances), RCD Español, RC Celta de Vigo – helping to a 1992 promotion to La Liga– CD Logroñés, CD Toledo and Córdoba CF.

Mandiá totalled 89 top-flight matches over the course of seven seasons, going scoreless in the process.

Coaching career
Mandiá started a coaching career two years after retiring, achieving promotion from the Segunda División B with Hércules CF in 2005. In the 2006–07 season of Segunda División, he served as assistant to Míchel at Real Madrid Castilla, as they eventually dropped down a level.

Mandiá then took over as manager, falling just one point short of playoff contention in the 2007–08 campaign. After a second spell at Hércules, he was named Racing de Santander's manager in late June 2009. After a poor start to the season, with only one point in the first five home matches, he was sacked by the Cantabrians on 9 November.

Mandiá returned to active in late September 2010, replacing fired Gonzalo Arconada at CD Tenerife (five games, five losses). On 23 January 2011, following a 1–1 home draw against UD Las Palmas, he too was dismissed.

In December 2013, Mandiá was appointed at second-division club Deportivo Alavés, but was relieved of his duties after only three months in charge. On 10 February 2015 he was hired at CE Sabadell FC for the rest of the season, and left on 10 June once the Catalans were relegated to the third tier.

Subsequently, Mandiá worked as assistant manager to Míchel at Ligue 1 side Olympique de Marseille, Málaga CF, Liga MX's Club Universidad Nacional and Getafe CF.

Managerial statistics

Honours

Player
Real Madrid
La Liga: 1987–88

Celta
Segunda División: 1991–92

References

External links

1967 births
Living people
People from A Mariña Central
Sportspeople from the Province of Lugo
Spanish footballers
Footballers from Galicia (Spain)
Association football defenders
La Liga players
Segunda División players
Segunda División B players
Real Madrid Castilla footballers
Real Madrid CF players
RCD Espanyol footballers
RC Celta de Vigo players
CD Logroñés footballers
CD Toledo players
Córdoba CF players
Spain youth international footballers
Spanish football managers
La Liga managers
Segunda División managers
Segunda División B managers
CD Logroñés managers
Hércules CF managers
Real Madrid Castilla managers
Racing de Santander managers
CD Tenerife managers
Deportivo Alavés managers
CE Sabadell FC managers
Spanish expatriate sportspeople in France
Spanish expatriate sportspeople in Mexico
Spanish expatriate sportspeople in Greece